The 1992 Eastern Michigan Eagles football team represented Eastern Michigan University in the 1992 NCAA Division I-A football season. The team compiled a 1–10 record (1–7 against conference opponents), finished in a tie for last place in the Mid-American Conference, and were outscored by their opponents, 336 to 117. Jim Harkema was the head coach for the first four games, compiling a 0–4 and was then replaced by Jan Quarless who compiled a 1–6 record in the final seven games. In the third game of the season, the Hurons were defeated by Penn State by a 52 to 7 score. Harkema had been the head coach since 1983. The team's statistical leaders included Kwesi Ramsey with 592 passing yards, Stephen Whitfield with 377 rushing yards, and Craig Thompson with 329 receiving yards.

Schedule

References

Eastern Michigan
Eastern Michigan Eagles football seasons
Eastern Michigan Eagles football